The Adam Smith Society is a chapter-based association of business school students and professionals named after the 18th-century economist, Adam Smith, and established by the Manhattan Institute for Policy Research in 2011, to promote discussion about the moral, social, and economic benefits of capitalism. The Adam Smith Society has been described as having been formed "to achieve in business schools what the Federalist Society achieved in law schools, exposing students to the philosophical and moral underpinnings of capitalism", and has been compared with the Benjamin Rush Society in medical schools and the Alexander Hamilton Society in foreign policy education, based on the fact that "all three groups subscribe to principles of individual liberty, limited government, and free markets".

The Society hosts events on public policy, business, entrepreneurship and technology with scholars, experts, and business leaders from across the ideological spectrum. Events have focused on technology,  free trade,  entrepreneurship,  and the works of Adam Smith.  In addition to chapter-based lectures, debates, and dinners, the Adam Smith Society has an annual meeting and leadership retreat in New York City; destination-based treks for members to learn about a particular subject; and one-off events, such as case competitions.

History

In late 2010, the Manhattan Institute partnered  with the Marilyn G. Fedak Capitalism Project to establish the Adam Smith Society at elite U.S. business schools, with a goal to create a new organization to:

Since 2011, the Adam Smith Society has expanded to more than 30 chapters at MBA schools, as well as professional chapters in major cities. In 2014, the Adam Smith Society collaborated with Encounter Books and James R. Otteson to publish an anthology of writings by Adam Smith and other important economic thinkers titled What Adam Smith Knew. In fall 2017, the Society launched their first international professional chapter in London, United Kingdom. The Society's first international student chapter was founded at The Hebrew University of Jerusalem, Israel in May 2018.

The Adam Smith Society is not directly related to the 19th century Adam Smith Society promoted by Italian economist and proponent of capitalism Francesco Ferrara, and to the International Adam Smith Society established in 1995, although it has some interests in common with each of these, and all share the same namesake.

Chapters

, the organization had nine city-based professional chapters and more than 30 student chapters. Professional chapters are located in Austin, Boston, Chicago, Dallas, Houston, London, New York City, San Francisco, and Washington, D.C. Student chapters can be found at most of the top business schools across the United States, and in several other countries. These include:

Hankamer School of Business, Baylor University
Haas School of Business, University of California, Berkeley
Questrom School of Business, Boston University
Marriott School of Business, Brigham Young University
Tepper School of Business, Carnegie Mellon University
Booth School of Business, University of Chicago
Leeds School of Business, University of Colorado–Boulder
College of Business and Administration, The University of Colorado–Colorado Springs
Columbia Business School, Columbia University
SC Johnson College of Business, Cornell University
Tuck School of Business, Dartmouth College
Fuqua School of Business, Duke University
Goizueta Business School, Emory University
McDonough School of Business, Georgetown University
Harvard Business School, Harvard University
Kelley School of Business, Indiana University
MIT Sloan School of Management, Massachusetts Institute of Technology
Ross School of Business, University of Michigan
Stern School of Business, New York University
Kellogg School of Management, Northwestern University
The Wharton School, University of Pennsylvania
Jesse H. Jones Graduate School of Business, Rice University
Cox School of Business, Southern Methodist University
Stanford Graduate School of Business, Stanford University
McCombs School of Business, University of Texas at Austin
UCLA Anderson School of Management, University of California, Los Angeles
Joseph M. Katz Graduate School of Business, University of Pittsburgh 
UNC Kenan–Flagler Business School, University of North Carolina at Chapel Hill
USC Marshall School of Business, University of Southern California
Owen Graduate School of Management, Vanderbilt University
Darden School of Business, University of Virginia
Olin Business School, Washington University in St. Louis
Yale School of Management, Yale University
Hebrew University of Jerusalem
Mendoza College of Business, University of Notre Dame

Activities and events

National Meeting
The Adam Smith Society National Meeting, an annual two-day spring weekend in New York City, brings together MBA students, alumni, policy experts and business leaders for panels and discussion. An awards ceremony highlights the winners of various competitive awards. The Principled Leadership Award is presented annually to a business leader who best embodies the Adam Smith Society. Past recipients include Cliff Asness and Kenneth C. Griffin.

The April 2018 National Meeting featured a debate in partnership with Intelligence Squared U.S. on bitcoin and cryptocurrencies, featuring Tim Draper, Patrick M. Byrne, Eric Posner, and Gillian Tett. Draper "was asked how Bitcoin compared with his previous tech investments" and gave a positive evaluation of the technology, estimating that it would be bigger than Hotmail, Skype, and Tesla combined.

Case competition
In 2018, the Society inaugurated an annual case competition allowing student chapters to compete against one another in devising a solution to a variety of business issues. All student chapters can apply to host the competition or send a team to compete. The first such competition was hosted, and won, by the Brigham Young University Marriott School of Business chapter.

Other programs
Chapters of the Society have hosted various speaking events on their respective campuses. In October 2016, the MIT Sloan School of Management chapter hosted Zambian economist Dambisa Moyo. In 2017, Time magazine noted that concerns were raised when political scientist Charles Murray was invited to speak at "an invitation-only address organized by the Vanderbilt chapter of the Adam Smith Society, an association for MBA students" a month after Murray had been aggressively confronted at an event at Middlebury College in Vermont. In February 2018, the Darden School of Business chapter had a Liberty Week, a "series of events exploring the role capitalism plays in global economic systems", including a speaking engagement by senior Economist editor Ryan Avent discussing the impact that continuing technological development would have on the economy.

Personnel
The organization has an Advisory Board composed of the following members:

Marilyn G. Fedak, Vice President Emeritus, Alliance Bernstein and Founder, Marilyn G. Fedak Capitalism Project
Evan Baehr, Co-Founder, Able Lending, & Co-Author, Get Backed
Eugene B. Meyer, President, The Federalist Society for Law and Public Policy Studies
Lawrence Mone, President, Manhattan Institute for Policy Research
James Piereson, President, The William E. Simon Foundation

References

Manhattan Institute for Policy Research
Student societies in the United States
Organizations established in 2011